Babakan Madang is a district  (Indonesian: kecamatan) in the Bogor Regency, West Java, Indonesia. Because of the regency's recognition as part of Jakarta's larger conurbation, the regency is often considered as the city's outermost suburbs, the closest city in the region to Babakan Madang being Bogor. It lies just a few kilometres east of Bogor, and lies directly east of another district named Sukaraja.

Features of the district

Babakan Madang features a lot of new housing complexes and planned neighbourhoods built to serve commuters to Jakarta; with most of these projects being centred in an area now known as "Sentul". Out of all the many architectural and real estate projects that have ever taken place here, most were from the construction of "Sentul City". 

Lying within these neighbourhoods and "Sentul City" itself, is the famous Sentul International Circuit, which has hosted plentiful of international racing events in the past, namely in the years/seasons of 1996–97, 2005–07, and 2008. Also within the district is the large Sentul International Convention Center (or SICC for short), which became one of Greater Jakarta's largest and well-known commercial conference halls.

Overall, the main way to access both Sentul and Babakan Madang, is through the Jagorawi toll road, which is located on the district's western edge. It has direct access to both the capital city; that is Jakarta, as well as to Bogor and Ciawi to the south.

References

Districts of Bogor Regency